The 2010 IIHF World U18 Championship Division III was an international under-18 ice hockey competition organised by the International Ice Hockey Federation. Both Division III tournaments made up the fourth level of the IIHF World U18 Championships. The Group A tournament was played in Erzurum, Turkey, and the Group B tournament was played in Monterrey, Mexico. China and New Zealand won the Group A and B tournaments respectively and gained promotion to the Division II of the 2011 IIHF World U18 Championships.

Group A
The Group A tournament was played in Erzurum, Turkey, from 8 to 14 March 2010.

Final Standings

 is promoted to Division II for the 2011 IIHF World U18 Championships.

Results
All times are local (EET – UTC+02:00).

Group B
The Group B tournament was played in Monterrey, Mexico, from 14 to 20 March 2010.

Final Standings

 is promoted to Division II for the 2011 IIHF World U18 Championships.

Results
All times are local (CST – UTC−06:00).

See also
2010 IIHF World U18 Championships
2010 IIHF World U18 Championship Division I
2010 IIHF World U18 Championship Division II

References

IIHF World U18 Championship Division III
III
International ice hockey competitions hosted by Turkey
International ice hockey competitions hosted by Mexico
Sport in Erzurum
Youth ice hockey in Turkey
2010 in Mexican sports
Sport in Monterrey
World
World